You may be looking for:

 Mirror (computing)
 Fork (software development)